The Puttalam Lagoon is a large  lagoon in the Puttalam District, western Sri Lanka.

It is linked to Mundal Lagoon  to the south by a channel. The lagoon's water is brackish to saline.

The lagoon is surrounded by a region containing coconuts, open forests, grasslands and shrublands. The land is used for prawn fishing, salt production, and rice cultivation. The lagoon has extensive mangroves, seagrasses and some salt marshes, attracting a wide variety of anatidae.

Islands 

A moderate number islands scatter over the lagoon including:

See also 

 Geography of Sri Lanka

References 

Bodies of water of Puttalam District
Lagoons of Sri Lanka